Belzora is a ghost town located in Smith County, Texas, United States.

Overview 
Belzora was a thriving Port Town in Texas in the 1850s before railroads became a much more affordable way to travel. Belzora was located on the Sabine River a winding river that made it hard for steamboats to navigate. The town at its peak had several dozen businesses, post office, schoolhouse and a church. Plans were made to make the river deeper which never worked and was soon abandoned after the railroad became much more popular in the 1870s.

References 

Ghost towns in East Texas
Geography of Smith County, Texas